The Palace of Darius in Susa was a palace complex that was built at the site of Susa, Iran, during the reign of Darius I over the Achaemenid Empire. The construction was conducted parallel to that of Persepolis. Manpower and raw materials from various parts of the Achaemenid Empire contributed to its construction. It was once destroyed by fire and was partially restored later; little has remained from the complex, which is today part of an archaeological site.

History

The palace complex was constructed by the Achaemenid king Darius I in Susa, his favorite capital. Construction works continued under Darius I's son, Xerxes, and to a lesser extent, Artaxerxes I (465–424 BC) and Darius II (423–404 BC). Artaxerxes II (404–358 BC) partially restored the palace as it was destroyed by a fire during the reign of Artaxerxes I fifty years earlier. The palace was captured and plundered by the invading Macedonians under Alexander the Great in December 330 BC.

The site of the palace has been greatly damaged during the past seven decades.

Construction

Construction was carried out at Susa parallel to those at Persepolis. A covered passage ("Propylaeum") faces these structures. The apadana at Susa is similar to that of Persepolis, using the distinctive Persian column, topped by two bulls, which was probably developed here.

Sources describing Achaemenid-era Susa are rare. The Achaemenid constructions at Susa are mostly known through the royal inscriptions, which are mostly trilingual—in Old Persian, Elamite, and Babylonian. Unlike the massive number of clay tablets found in Persepolis, only few clay tablets have been found in Susa, despite its important political and economic situation.

According to Gene R. Garthwaite, the Susa Palace served as Darius' model for Persepolis. Comparing the palace to that of Pasargadae, the former Achaemenid capital, he argues that Susa even more represented Achaemenid simultaneous rulership, and "what was symbolic was actualized", such that Darius's rule "could command craftsmen and material from the breadth of the empire" to build the monument, as is described in Darius' "charter of foundation" of the palace (or the DSf inscription), which enumerates the workers and the material used:

Gallery

References

Further reading

External links

 "Susa, Palace of Darius the Great", Livius

Susa
Darius the Great
Xerxes I
Artaxerxes I
Darius II
Artaxerxes II
Buildings and structures completed in the 5th century BC
Achaemenid architecture
Archaeological sites in Iran
Demolished buildings and structures in Iran
Fires in Iran
Royal residences in Iran
Ruins in Iran
Buildings and structures in Khuzestan Province